Utimmira was an ancient Roman town of the Roman province of Africa Proconsularis. The town was somewhere near Carthage in today's Tunisia, but the exact location has been lost to history. 

Utimmira was the seat of an ancient episcopal see, suffragan of Archdiocese of Carthage. Only two bishops attributed to this diocese: the Catholic Severo, who intervened at the Council of Carthage (411) and Bishop Reparato, who took part in the Council of Carthage (484) called by the Vandal king Huneric, after which Reparato was exiled to Corsica. 
Today Utimmira survives as titular bishop, the current bishop is Andrés Vargas Peña, of Mexico City.

References

Ancient Berber cities
Roman towns and cities in Tunisia
Catholic titular sees in Africa
Former Roman Catholic dioceses in Africa